Jędrzychowice may refer to the following places in Poland:
Jędrzychowice, Strzelin County in Lower Silesian Voivodeship (south-west Poland)
Jędrzychowice, Zgorzelec County in Lower Silesian Voivodeship (south-west Poland)
Jędrzychowice, Wschowa County in Lubusz Voivodeship (west Poland)
Jędrzychowice, Żary County in Lubusz Voivodeship (west Poland)